Joe Kirkwood may refer to:

 Joe Kirkwood Sr. (1897–1970), Australian golfer
 Joe Kirkwood Jr. (1920–2006), professional golfer and film actor